Østhavet (the East Sea) is a local Norwegian newspaper published in Vardø in Finnmark county. The newspaper was established in 1997 and it serves the settlements of Vardø and Kiberg. The newspaper is published every Thursday and usually has 20 pages. The chief editor is Dan Tore Jørgensen. The newspaper was named Norway's Local Newspaper of the Year (Årets lokalavis) in 1997.

Circulation
According to the Norwegian Audit Bureau of Circulations and National Association of Local Newspapers, Østhavet has had the following annual circulation:

References

External links
Østhavet homepage

Newspapers published in Norway
Norwegian-language newspapers
Vardø
Mass media in Finnmark
Newspapers established in 1997
1997 establishments in Norway